Puthja e fundit (The last kiss) is a summary of poems written by Irma Kurti and published in 2007. It is dedicated to her mother, Sherife Kurti.

The book contains 65 poems. The theme of the first section is the pain of the loss of the author's most beloved person. They present the reality that the poet is living day by day. Poems such as “Ti s’mund të ikësh” (You can't leave), “Doja të të thosha” (I would like to tell you), “Sekrete” (Secrets), “Në krahët e mi” (In my arms), and “Takove vdekjen” (You met the death) touch day by day the drama of Kurti losing her mother. The poems look like a dialogue with the reader, and Irma Kurti manages to convey her message in a very natural way.

These feelings seem to prevail even in the second part of the book, labeled “Lyrics”. The pain has become part of the author and although she is always in search of love, most of the time she seems not able to love, to enjoy the lights, the sun, the songs of the spring.

Albanian literature